is a Japanese animator. She is noted for her work with Sunrise, where she was the supervising animator and character designer for the City Hunter series and several others, mentoring future several Sunrise character designers and animators, including Toshihiro Kawamoto.

Prior to working at Sunrise, Kamimura previously worked at Toei Animation and Walt Disney Animation Japan. She worked as general supervising animator and character designer when the Tezuka Production Company Ltd. made the Black Jack (manga) into a TV series.

Kamimura adapted characters and artwork for The Heroic Legend of Arslan anime and designed them for the Brain Lord video game, as well as producing illustrations for many Japanese novels.

As of 2021, Kamimura is appointed Dean of the Kaishi Professional University's Anime and Manga department. The University in Niigata prefecture will host 80 students in the said program starting April 2021, Crunchyroll announced on its website.

References

External links 
 Sachiko Kamimura anime listing at Media Arts Database 
 

Japanese women illustrators
Japanese animators
Japanese women animators
Anime character designers
Living people
Sunrise (company) people
Year of birth missing (living people)